Predrag Govedarica (born 21 October 1984) is a Serbian football midfielder who plays for IMT.

Career
In August 2014, Govedarica joined Napredak Kruševac on loan.
In January 2016, Govedarica signed for FC Akzhayik.

References

External links
 
 Predrag Govedarica stats at utakmica.rs
 Predrag Govedarica stats at footballdatabase.eu

1984 births
Living people
Footballers from Belgrade
Association football midfielders
Serbian footballers
FK Čukarički players
OFK Mladenovac players
FK Srem players
FK Bežanija players
FK Napredak Kruševac players
FC Irtysh Pavlodar players
FC Akzhayik players
FC Taraz players
FK Proleter Novi Sad players
RFK Grafičar Beograd players
FK Kabel players
FK IMT players
Serbian expatriate footballers
Serbian expatriate sportspeople in Kazakhstan
Expatriate footballers in Kazakhstan
Serbian SuperLiga players
Serbian First League players
Kazakhstan Premier League players